Rafael da Silva may refer to:

Footballers
Rafael Silva (footballer, born 1984), Brazilian football defender
Rafael (footballer, born 1990), full name Rafael Pereira da Silva, Brazilian football right-back, currently playing for Botafogo
Rafael Silva (footballer, born 1990), Brazilian football forward, currently playing for Madura United
Rafael Silva (footballer, born 1992), Brazilian football forward, currently playing for Wuhan Zall
Rafael Silva (footballer, born 1995), Brazilian football forward, currently playing for Vila Nova

Others
Rafael Silva (fighter), Brazilian MMA fighter
Rafael Silva (judoka), Brazilian judoka
Rafael Silva (cyclist) (born 1990), Portuguese cyclist